Mammilla sebae is a species of predatory sea snail, a marine gastropod mollusc in the family Naticidae, the moon snails.

Description

Distribution
This species occurs in the Indian Ocean off Tanzania.

References

 Spry, J.F. (1961). The sea shells of Dar es Salaam: Gastropods. Tanganyika Notes and Records 56
 Kabat A.R., Finet Y. & Way K. (1997) Catalogue of the Naticidae (Mollusca: Gastropoda) described by C.A. Récluz, including the location of the type specimens. Apex 12(1): 15-26.
 Steyn, D.G. & Lussi, M. (1998) Marine Shells of South Africa. An Illustrated Collector’s Guide to Beached Shells. Ekogilde Publishers, Hartebeespoort, South Africa, ii + 264 pp. page(s): 50
 Kabat A.R. (2000) Results of the Rumphius Biohistorical Expedition to Ambon (1990). Part 10. Mollusca, Gastropoda, Naticidae. Zoologische Mededelingen 73(25): 345-380
 Hollman M. (2008) Naticidae. In Poppe G.T. (ed.) Philippine marine mollusks, vol. 1: 482-501, pls 186-195. Hackenheim: Conchbooks.
 Torigoe K. & Inaba A. (2011) Revision on the classification of Recent Naticidae. Bulletin of the Nishinomiya Shell Museum 7: 133 + 15 pp., 4 pls.

External links

Endemic fauna of Tanzania
Naticidae
Gastropods described in 1844